Tabidia obvia is a moth in the family Crambidae. It was first described by Xi-Cui Du and Hou-Hun Li in 2014. It is found in China in Gansu, Hubei, Chongqing, Sichuan, Guizhou, Zhejiang and Guangdong.

The wingspan is 18–22 mm. The forewings are pale yellow or pale ochreous with an indistinct brown spot below the discal cell near the base. The antemedial line is represented by fuscous spots and the discoidal stigma has the form of a fuscous stripe. There are several short fuscous streaks around the end of the discal cell. The postmedial line consists of fuscous spots and there are some indistinct brown streaks in the terminal interspaces. The hindwings are yellowish white with a pale yellow terminal area.

Etymology
The species name refers to the distinct subterminal line on the hindwings and is derived from Latin obvius (meaning obvious).

References

Moths described in 2014
Spilomelinae